The Charles River, which is often called Charles Creek is an ephemeral river in the southern Northern Territory. It is a tributary of the Todd River and, like the Todd River, its naming is associated with Charles Todd; a senior civil servant involved with the Overland Telegraph Line.

The Arrernte name for the river is Anthelke Ulpaye and this name is shared with a nearby Alice Springs Town Camp which is situated on its banks: this camp was once the site of the Little Flower Mission and is now commonly referred to as Charles Creek Camp. The Alice Springs Telegraph Station, which was once The Bungalow is also situated close by.

The area where the Charles and Todd Rivers meet is called Tyuretye (sometimes spelt Choritja) by the Arrernte people as the true central point of Alice Springs: Ted Strehlow noted in one of his major works, Songs of Central Australia, that Tjoritja as the "original name for Alice Springs."

See also 

 List of rivers of Northern Territory

References 

Rivers of the Northern Territory
Alice Springs
Lake Eyre basin